Semarang Poncol Station is a historic railway station in Purwosari, North Semarang, Semarang, Indonesia. It was built in 1914 and is considered an early example of Art Deco architecture.

Services 
The following is a list of train services at the Semarang Poncol Station

Passenger services

Mixed class

 Joglosemarkerto, (exexutive-economy) looping train Central Java and the Special Region of Yogyakarta class executive-economy with destinations:
  via -
  via --

Economy class
 Tawang Jaya, destination of 
 Maharani, destination of 
 Ambarawa Ekspres, destination of 
 Kaligung, destination of --
 Blora Jaya Ekspres, destination of

Commuter 
 Kedung Sepur, destination of

Freight services
 Freight container, destination of Jakarta ( or ) and Surabaya or Gresik

Gallery

References

External links
 
  Situs resmi KAI dan jadwal kereta api tahun 2019
  Semarang Ponco

Buildings and structures in Semarang
Railway stations in Central Java
Railway stations opened in 1914
1914 establishments in the Dutch East Indies